Uyghur is a Turkic language spoken mostly in the west of China.

Uyghur exhibits the agglutination characteristic to the Turkic family and its basic word order is subject-object-verb. It lacks grammatical gender and does not use  articles. The language's inventory of 24 consonants and eight vowels features both vowel harmony and consonant harmony. Nouns are marked for ten cases, in general with suffixes and are additionally inflected for number.

This article uses both the Arabic script (official for the language) and Latin script for Uyghur words.

General characteristics

The typical word order in Uyghur is subject–object–verb , as in the sentence "men
uyghurche oquymen", lit., "I Uyghur study" Compare this to English, where the sentence would be expressed with subject–verb–object order: "I study Uyghur".

Uyghur is an agglutinative language, meaning that potentially many suffixes (denoting person, number, case, mood, etc.) are usually all attached to one word stem. For example "to your house," the main word, house, occurs first, and the modifying elements are attached directly to the right and written all in one word:

Nouns are not distinguished for gender (e.g. male, female), unlike in such languages as French, Spanish and German. Nouns are usually pluralized (with the suffix +lAr) except when preceded by a numeral: compare "atlar" ("horses") and "ikki at" (two horses). Instead of using articles (like English "a", "the"), Uyghur uses demonstrative pronouns ("this", "that") and no marker or the numeral one (bir) to indicate definiteness and indefiniteness, respectively, "this cat/the cat" vs. بىر مۈشۈك(bir müshük) "a/one cat" or مۈشۈك(müshük) "cat/cats."

Uyghur verbs take , usually at least for tense (present, past) and person (I, you, s/he, they, etc.), for example

Uyghur verbs can also take other suffixes to mark voice (causative, passive), aspect (continuous), mood (e.g. ability), as well as suffixes that change verbs into nouns—sometimes many all together:

Negation usually also appears as a verb suffix, e.g.

Uyghur has vowel and consonant harmony, a system where vowels or consonants in a word come to match or become similar to each other, especially as suffixes and other elements are attached. Many but not all words and grammatical elements in Uyghur behave according to these harmonic principles. If a suffix is written with one or more capital letters (e.g. +DA, +lAr, +GA, etc.), these capital letters indicate that these sounds are harmonic, that is, variable: D= d/t, G= gh/q/g/k; K= k/q; A= a/e; I= i/u/ü or ø/i/u/ü.

Sound system

There are 32 basic sounds in Modern Uyghur.

Consonants

Uyghur has 24 consonants (listed here according to the Arabic-script alphabet): b, p, t, j, ch, x, d, r, z, zh, s, sh, gh, f, q, k, g, ng, l, m, n, x, h, w, y  (and 25 consonants if the glottal stop ‘ is counted). Most are not pronounced much differently than their English counterparts (e.g. Uyghur j in baj "tax" is pronounced like j in judge; Uyghur ch in üch "three" is pronounced like ch in itch; Uyghur h in he’e "yes" is pronounced like h in hello), except that l has palatal or velar variants. A few sounds are not found in English: q gh and x. The voiceless uvular stop q [qȹ] is pronounced like a back k, with the back of the tongue touching the soft palate, as in aq "white," Qeshqer "Kashgar." The sound gh  is typically a voiced fricative version of q, also pronounced at the very back of the mouth and sounds like French or German r, as in Roissy or Ruhr. (Near front vowels, gh is often pronounced more front, like French Rue or German Rübe.) Finally, the Uyghur voiceless velar or uvular fricative x  is pronounced like ch in Scottish loch, or further back in the mouth, like a back version of German ach.

The four sounds k, g, q and gh are subject to consonant harmony: (1) within a stem (main word), they potentially determine its backness and (2) within a variable suffix, they conform to the backness and voicing of the preceding stem. Consonant harmony is discussed below.

The ژ zh  (sounds like English garage), is only for foreign and onomatopoeic words like zhurnal ‘magazine, journal’ and pizh-pizh "sizzling." The letter ج j (normally pronounced  as in baj ‘tax’) is in southern Xinjiang often pronounced . Initial y  can also be pronounced  before i, e.g. yilan  ‘snake’.

In Uyghur words of Turkic origin, sh is rare, except as a suffix; similarly, since f was borrowed into Uyghur from Arabic and Persian, it is often replaced by p, especially in colloquial and rural usage: fakultët~pakultët ‘academic department’.

Vowels

Uyghur has eight vowels. Vowels are rounded (o, u, ü, ö) and unrounded (a, i, e, ë); this distinction is sometimes termed labial vs. non-labial; they are front (ü, ö, e) or back (u, o, a). These distinctions are critical for harmonic purposes, since Uyghur words are subject to vowel harmony. The orthographic vowel i represents both a front [i] and a back [ɨ] and is not subject to vowel harmony.

Uyghur accent (stress or high pitch, which we will for convenience call stress) is not well understood, yet some general remarks can be made to aid language learning. In Uyghur, stress is mostly determined by the length of syllables. This means that a syllable which is closed (i.e., ends in consonants [CVC or CVCC]) tends to attract stress, while a syllable which is open (i.e. ends in a vowel [CV]) does not. A general rule of thumb is: stress the last syllable of the stem, e.g. ayagh "foot," Turpan'gha "to Turfan." (in the vocabulary lists, we underline stressed syllables.)

Word-internal harmony is relatively weak in Uyghur, but when suffixes are added to a word stem, certain suffix vowels and consonants harmonize with those of the stem. There are two variable vowels in Uyghur, A (a/e) and I (i/u/ü). There is one harmonically variable consonant type: G (k/g/q/gh). Uyghur’s harmony system has three relevant components: voicing, backness and roundness harmony.

Nouns
Nouns in Uyghur have no grammatical gender or definite marking, although the number 'one' bir can be used to mark indefiniteness. Plurals are marked by -lar or -ler, with the vowel following the rules of vowel harmony.

Cases
Uyghur has ten cases, all of which except the nominative are marked by suffixation after possible plural or possessive suffixes.

Pronouns

Personal pronouns 
In Uyghur there is one set of personal pronouns used for the first- and third person, while there are three in the second person. The use of the three sets in the second person depends on the formality and politeness.

The personal pronouns are inflected for number and case. Follow the links of each of the personal pronouns to see them inflected.

The second person personal pronoun mostly used among people is the polite سىز, siz, while the informal سەن, sen is used between very close friends or when parents are addressing their children. The informal سەن, sen is also used when the speaker has a higher social rank than the addressed person.

The respectful سىلى, sili is used for respectfully addressing elders, grandparents or other notable persons of a community. Royalty is also addressed using سىلى, sili and sometimes even customers in stores.

Demonstrative pronouns
Uyghur has several demonstrative pronouns with some of them being used for emphasis or as intensifiers, while others have less specific uses. Common for all of the demonstrative pronouns is that their use depends on the distance between the speaker and the thing or person to which is referred.

The demonstrative pronouns are inflected for number and case. In the table below, the demonstrative pronouns can be seen, although only in the singular. Follow the links of each of the demonstrative pronouns to see them inflected.

The most common demonstrative pronouns are بۇ, bu, ئۇ, u and شۇ, shu, the first being translated as this and the remaining two as that. The first is used when referring to an object or person which is visible and close to the speaker, the second is used when referring to an object or person which is away from the speaker and the third is used when referring to a previously mentioned object or person which is not particular close to the speaker in an affirmative statement.

The two first-mentioned demonstrative persons each have an intensified derived form ending in ۋۇ, -wu, ماۋۇ, mawu and ئاۋۇ, awu, respectively. These are used when it is necessary to make it clear that the object or person the demonstrative pronoun is referring to really is the object or person which the speaker means. The two first-mentioned demonstrative persons both also have another derived form, ending in شۇ, -shu, مۇشۇ, mushu and ئاشۇ, ashu, respectively. These are often used for confirming something the speaker is already familiar with.

The examples below illustrate the use of بۇ, bu and its derived forms.

References

Notes

General
 Abdurehim, Esmael (2014), The Lopnor dialect of Uyghur – A descriptive analysis (PDF),Publications of the Institute for Asian and African Studies 17, Helsinki: Unigrafia, 
 
 
 
  Translated by Anne Lee and reprinted in 2003 as Modern Uyghur Grammar (Morphology). Istanbul: Yıldız.

 

Turkic grammars
Uyghur language